Jerusalem attack may refer to:

1947 Jerusalem riots
1969 PFLP bombings in Jerusalem
1989 Tel Aviv–Jerusalem bus 405 suicide attack
2008 Jerusalem bulldozer attack
2008 Jerusalem BMW attack
2011 Jerusalem bus stop bombing
2014 Jerusalem synagogue attack
2014 Jerusalem unrest
August 2014 Jerusalem tractor attack
October 2014 Jerusalem vehicular attack
November 2014 Jerusalem vehicular attack
2015 Jerusalem bus attack
2016 Jerusalem bus bombing
2016 Jerusalem shooting attack
2017 Jerusalem Light Rail stabbing
2017 Jerusalem truck attack
June 2017 Jerusalem attack
2017 Temple Mount shooting
2021 Jerusalem shooting
2022 Jerusalem bombings
2023 East Jerusalem synagogue shooting